Jacob Fincham-Dukes (born 12 January 1997) is a British track and field athlete who competes in the long jump. In 2022, he became the English long jump champion.

Early life
He attended St Aidan's and St John Fisher Associated Sixth Form in Harrogate, North Yorkshire. He then attended Oklahoma State University–Stillwater for whom he became the school record holder at long jump indoors and outdoors and competed at the NCAA Championships.

Career

Junior Career
He was runner-up to Anatoliy Ryapolov and won silver at the 2015 European Athletics Junior Championships long jump competition in Eskilstuna, Sweden. His distance in that event was a personal best 7.75m and was described by his local newspaper the Harrogate Advertiser as “the length of two Mini Cooper’s. He won 6 England Long Jump junior titles between the ages of 15 and 22.

2021 Senior Championship Individual debut
Ficham-Dukes relocated to Oklahoma State University and competed on the American collegiate circuit. Returning to Europe to compete at the 2021 European Athletics Indoor Championships he finished seventh in the final of the long jump at the Arena Toruń in Poland in March 2021. This event came just after he achieved a new personal best jump of 8.08m at the British trials in Lee Valley. On 26 March, 2022 he jumped 8.45m 3.6w, the second longest jump in British history, in winning the Texas Relays.

2022 English Champion and outdoor Championship debut
On 31 July, 2022 he became the English long jump champion, jumping 7.58m in Bedford at the Bedford Athletic Stadium. After qualifying for the final of the long jump at the 2022 European Athletics Championships held in Munich in August 2022 Fincham-Dukes called out television broadcasters for not focusing enough on field events. In the final itself, he managed a 8.06m season best jump to lead the event after round one before ultimately finishing second. It was due to be his first medal at a senior major championships. However, after the event an appeal by the French Federation against his first jump was successful and after the event had ended it was deemed a foul. A counter appeal by the British team was unsuccessful and he was demoted from second to fifth.

References

External Links

 1997 births
Living people
British male long jumpers
English male long jumpers
People from the Borough of Harrogate 
Oklahoma State Cowboys track and field athletes